Pelargoderus flavicornis is a species of beetle in the family Cerambycidae. It is known from Charles Joseph Gahan in 1888. It is known from Sumatra.

References

flavicornis
Beetles described in 1888